Trouville-Deauville is the station for the towns of Deauville and Trouville-sur-Mer, Normandy. The station is built in neo-normand architecture and is a terminus for two railway lines, the main line from Paris by Lisieux and the Côte Fleurie branchline to Dives-Cabourg.

The line from Paris and Lisieux opened in 1863. The new station building (in current use) dates from 1931 and was built by Jean Philippot for the Chemin de fer de l'État.

References

External links

 

Railway stations in France opened in 1863
Railway stations in Calvados